St Martin's School or Saint Martin's School may refer to:

Saint Martin's School of Art, a former art college in London, merged in 1989 into Central Saint Martins
St Martin's School, Brentwood, a secondary school in Essex, England
St Martins School Northwood, a private boys school in London, England
St Martin's School (Shropshire), an all-through school in Shropshire, England
St. Martin's School (Rosettenville), a private school in Johannesburg, South Africa
St Martin's Ampleforth, a preparatory school in North Yorkshire, England
St Martins C.E.P. School Folkestone, a Church of England primary school in Kent, England
St Martin de Porres, Adelaide, a private school in South Australia
St. Martin de Porres High School (Cleveland), a Catholic high school in Ohio, United States
Cristo Rey St. Martin College Prep, formerly St. Martin de Porres High School, a Catholic high school in Illinois, United States
St. Martin's Episcopal School, a private school in Louisiana, United States
St. Martin High School, a high school in Mississippi, United States
St Martin-In-The-Fields High School for Girls, a Church of England girls secondary school in London, England
St. Martin Secondary School, a Catholic secondary school in Ontario, Canada

See also
Central Saint Martins
St. Martin Parish School Board
Saint Martin of Tours School (disambiguation)
St Martin's College